Eladio Antonio Rojas Reyes (born 30 June 1971) is a Chilean former professional footballer who played as a midfielder for clubs in Chile, Ecuador and Indonesia.

Club career
A product of Universidad de Chile youth system, then Rojas played for Santiago Morning in the Chilean Tercera División and for both Colchagua and Rangers de Talca in the Primera B until 1997. Along with Rangers, he won the 1997 Apertura of the Primera B and got promotion to the top division for the 1998 season. 

On second half 1998, he moved to Ecuador and joined Liga de Quito, where he coincided with the well-known Chilean coach Manuel Pellegrini in 1999. He also coincided with the Ecuador international Byron Tenorio, with whom met in Unión Española later. 

In 1999 he returned to Chile and played for Santiago Morning, Unión Española, Rangers and Deportes Temuco until 2003. In 2004 he went to Indonesia and played for Persiter Ternate and Persikad Depok in the Divisi Satu until 2006.

Coaching career
Following his retirement, Rojas has worked as coach of football academies of both Arsenal and Boca Juniors based in Indonesia. As an anecdote, he served as host for Diego Maradona when he visited the country.

He also had an experience as head coach of Boavista Timor-Leste in 2018, with his compatriot Antonio Vega as a player.

In addition, he works as coach and teller for the development of Indonesian women's football by training sessions and management coaching.

Honours
Universidad de Chile
 Segunda División de Chile: 1989

Rangers
 Primera B de Chile: 1997 Apertura

References

External links
 
 
 Eladio Rojas at PlaymakerStats
 Eladio Rojas at EDFLaLiga.com

1971 births
Living people
Footballers from Santiago
Chilean footballers
Chilean expatriate footballers
Universidad de Chile footballers
Santiago Morning footballers
Deportes Colchagua footballers
Rangers de Talca footballers
L.D.U. Quito footballers
Unión Española footballers
Deportes Temuco footballers
Persiter Ternate players
Persikad Depok players
Deportes Copiapó footballers
Chilean Primera División players
Tercera División de Chile players
Primera B de Chile players
Ecuadorian Serie A players
Chilean expatriate sportspeople in Ecuador
Chilean expatriate sportspeople in Indonesia
Expatriate footballers in Ecuador
Expatriate footballers in Indonesia
Association football forwards
Chilean football managers
Chilean expatriate football managers
Expatriate football managers in Indonesia
Chilean expatriate sportspeople in East Timor
Expatriate football managers in East Timor